Peter Lalor Vocational College is a public, co-educational high school located in Lalor, Victoria, Australia. It was created in 2012 from Peter Lalor Secondary College.

See also 
 Peter Lalor

References

External links
Peter Lalor Vocational College

Public high schools in Victoria (Australia)
Educational institutions established in 2012
2012 establishments in Australia
Buildings and structures in the City of Whittlesea